New Liberty is an unincorporated community in Franklin Township, Washington County, in the U.S. state of Indiana.

Geography

References

Unincorporated communities in Washington County, Indiana
Unincorporated communities in Indiana
Louisville metropolitan area